The Men's 4x100m relay T42-46 for amputee athletes at the 2004 Summer Paralympics were held in the Athens Olympic Stadium on 26 September. The event consisted of a single race, and was won by the team representing .

Final round

26 Sept. 2004, 21:25

Team Lists

References

M